NAFC may refer to

Organizations

North America
 North American Football Confederation
 Northwest Atlantic Fisheries Centre, of Canada
 National Association of Free Clinics, of the U.S.
 National Association For Continence, of the U.S.
 National Association of Friendship Centres - part of the Friendship Centre Movement of Canada
 National Anthropological Film Center, the previous name of the Human Studies Film Archives, part of the Smithsonian Institution in the U.S.
 Nash Finch Company (NASDAQ symbol: NAFC), a U.S. food distribution company

Australia
 National Aerial Firefighting Centre 
 North Adelaide Football Club, Australian rules football team in the South Australian National Football League

Elsewhere
 NAFC Marine Centre, a constituent institution of the University of the Highlands and Islands in Scotland